Cloud seeding in the United Arab Emirates is a strategy used by the government to address water challenges in the country. Cloud seeding is also referred to as man made precipitation and artificial rain making. The United Arab Emirates is one of the first countries in the Persian Gulf region to use cloud seeding technology. UAE scientists use cloud seeding technology to supplement the country's water insecurity, which stems from the extremely hot climate. They use weather radar to continuously monitor the atmosphere of the country. Forecasters and scientists have estimated that cloud seeding operations can enhance rainfall by as much as 30-35% percent in a clear atmosphere, and up to 10-15% in a more humid atmosphere. This practice has caused concerns regarding the impact on the environment because it is difficult to predict the long-term global implications.

Climate needs 
The UAE has an arid climate with less than 100mm per year of rainfall, a high evaporation rate of surface water and a low groundwater recharge rate. Rainfall in the UAE has been fluctuating over the last few decades in winter season between December and March.

The climate of the UAE is a very dry region aside from the coast and the border of the UAE and Oman, where there is high humidity. The UAE is located in a dust hotspot that contributes to the arid climate. There is little to no rainfall, due to frontal systems from the west and northwest, which yields few inches of rainfall per year. This lack of rainfall has scientists and the government worried about water security in the future.

Due to industrialization and population growth, the demand for water has rapidly increased. Current resources are being depleted and scarcity issues are arising. As a result, the UAE is looking to cloud seeding technologies to increase water security as well as renewability to combat water and food scarcity that may arise.

History 
Scientists have been experimenting with cloud seeding technology since the 1940s. The cloud-seeding program in the UAE was initiated in the late 1990s, as one of the first Middle Eastern countries to utilize this technique. In 2005, the UAE launched the UAE Prize for Excellence in Advancing the Science and Practice of Weather Modification in collaboration with the World Meteorological Organization (WMO). In 2010, cloud seeding began as a project by weather authorities to create artificial rain. The project, which began in July 2010 and cost $11 million USD, succeeded in creating rain storms in the Dubai and Abu Dhabi deserts.

Government involvement 
The UAE government developed a research program called the UAE Research Program for Rain Enhancement Science (UAEREP) in 2015. It allows scientists and researchers to pitch their potential solutions and conduct research to improve the accuracy of cloud seeding technology. After pitching research proposals, scientists are awarded grants through the UAEREP. Among its key goals are advancing the science, technology, and implementation of rain enhancement and encouraging additional investments in research funding and research partnerships to advance the field, increasing rainfall and ensuring water security globally. By early 2001, the UAEREP was conducting research projects in cooperation with the National Center for Atmospheric Research (NCAR) in the U.S., the Witwatersrand University in South Africa, the National Aeronautics and Space Agency (NASA) in the U.S.

The Program for Rain Enhancement Science is an initiative of the United Arab Emirates Ministry of Presidential Affairs. It is overseen by the UAE National Center of Meteorology & Seismology (NCMS) based in Abu Dhabi.

In 2014, a total of 187 missions was sent to seed clouds in the UAE with each aircraft taking about three hours to target five to six clouds at a cost of $3,000 per operation. In 2017 the UAE had 214 missions, and in 2018, it had 184 missions, and 247 missions were launched in 2019. Tests of new technologies were done in 2020 with partners in the United States to test the use of nanomaterials for seeding.

Technology

The augmentation of rainfall considers both the ground-based and airborne processes that occur in different rain cloud types (but generally focused on convective clouds). The UAE utilizes operational aircraft-based and drone-controlled hygroscopic cloud seeding as opposed to conventional randomized aircraft seeding, as it does not take into consideration the varying properties of rain clouds, especially present in dusty and arid regions like the UAE. Since 2021, the devices have been equipped with a payload of electric-charge emission instruments and customized sensors that fly at low altitudes and deliver an electric charge to air molecules. Hygroscopic cloud seeding uses natural salts such as potassium chloride and sodium chloride that pre-exist in the atmosphere with hygroscopic flares. By introducing Hygroscopic particles, it enhances the natural rain particles which begins a collision-coalescence process.

At present, the UAE mostly cloud seeds in the eastern mountains on the border to Oman to raise levels in aquifers and reservoirs.  The country has 75 networked automatic weather stations distributed across the country UAE, 7 air quality stations, a Doppler weather radar network of five stationary and one mobile radar, and six Beechcraft King Air C90 aircraft distributed across the country for cloud seeding operations.

Environmental impact

Flooding 
The influx of rainfall from cloud seeding greatly affects the non-equipped infrastructure of the UAE. A cloud seeding experiment conducted in October 2019 by the UAE National Center of Meteorology & Seismology as part of the UAE Research Program for Rain Enhancement Science in January 2020 resulted in flooding. In 2020, a flood resulted from a cloud seeding experiment conducted in 2019 by the UAE National Center of Meteorology & Seismology as part of the UAE Research Program for Rain Enhancement Science. Pumps were needed to remove excess water because drainage systems could not handle the volume of water, severely impacting commercial and residential areas. It is estimated that the UAE will invest 500 million dirhams ($136.1 million) to protect against flooding of infrastructure and transportation after severe artificial storms.

Sharjah city is one of the most populous cities in the UAE and has already experienced significant flooding after cloud seeding activity. Better data can help ensure that the seeding activity will not exceed the threshold of the city’s drainage systems. Other infrastructure should be evaluated to mitigate potential damages. Researchers suggest that regular updates of IDF curves are made in order to achieve comprehensive rainfall data.

Atmospheric aerosols 
Cloud seeding missions require firing salts and silver iodine crystals into the atmosphere. The increased concentration of particulate matter, or micro-pollutants, increases risk for respiratory illnesses. In 2017, a study was conducted before and after cloud seeding missions, which recorded an increase of particulate matter, correlating to the months of active artificial rain. Researchers attribute this to left over silver iodine crystals that were not dispersed in the rain during the cloud seeding months. A study was conducted called the UAE Unified Aerosol Experiment (UAE2) to assess the progress and effectiveness of cloud seeding specifically in the UAE. Researchers found a significant increase in rainfall trends in areas with cloud seeding. More recently, over 20 regions in the UAE that participated in cloud seeding experiments have a higher concentration of particulate matter. The overall environmental impact of cloud seeding is difficult measure due to the inability to perform controlled experiments along with the difficulty in direct tracing.

See also 
Cloud seeding

United Arab Emirates

Environmental issues in the United Arab Emirates

Arabian Desert

Abu Dhabi

Dubai Electricity and Water Authority

Sharjah Electricity and Water Authority

Particulates

References

Weather modification
Science and technology in the United Arab Emirates
Science experiments